Kavkazskaya is a rural locality (a stanitsa) and the administrative center of Kavkazsky District in Krasnodar Krai, Russia, located on the Kuban River. Population:  The stanitsa was the administrative center of the Kavkazsky Otdel of the Kuban Oblast.

References

Rural localities in Krasnodar Krai
Kavkazsky District
Kuban Oblast